The Tajikistani Civil War, also known as the Tajik Civil War, began in May 1992 when regional groups from the Garm and Gorno-Badakhshan regions of Tajikistan rose up against the newly formed government of President Rahmon Nabiyev, which was dominated by people from the Khujand and Kulob regions. The rebel groups were led by a combination of liberal democratic reformers and Islamists, who would later organize under the banner of the United Tajik Opposition. The government was supported by Russian military and border guards.

The main zone of conflict was in the country's south, although disturbances occurred nationwide. The civil war was at its peak during its first year and continued for five years, devastating the country. An estimated 20,000 to 150,000 people were killed in the conflict, and about 10 to 20 percent of the population of Tajikistan were internally displaced. On 27 June 1997, Tajikistan president Emomali Rahmon, United Tajik Opposition (UTO) leader Sayid Abdulloh Nuri and Special Representative of the United Nations Secretary-General Gerd Merrem signed the General Agreement on the Establishment of Peace and National Accord in Tajikistan and the Moscow Protocol in Moscow, Russia, ending the war.

History

Background

There were numerous causes of civil war in Tajikistan, such as economic hardship, communal way of life of Tajiki people and their high religiosity. Under Soviet President Mikhail Gorbachev's 'Perestroika' policies, a Muslim-Democratic movement began to emerge in Tajiki SSR. The backbone of opposition were Party of Tajikistan Muslim Resurrection, Democratic party of Tajikistan and some other movements. The fight between the former communist elite and opposition shifted from the political sphere to an ethnic and clan based one.

Tensions began in the spring of 1992 after opposition members took to the streets in demonstrations against the results of the 1991 presidential election. President Rahmon Nabiyev and Speaker of the Supreme Soviet Safarali Kenjayev orchestrated the dispersal of weapons to pro-government militias, while the opposition turned to mujahidin in Afghanistan for military aid.

Conflict (1992–1993)
Fighting broke out on 5 May 1992 between old-guard supporters of the government and a loosely organized opposition composed of ethnic and regional groups from the Gharm and Gorno-Badakhshan areas (the latter were also known as Pamiris). Ideologically, the opposition included democratic liberal reformists and Islamists. The government, on the other hand, was dominated by people from the Leninabadi region, which had also made up most of the ruling elite during the entire Soviet period. It was also supported by people from the Kulob region, who had held high posts in the Ministry of Internal Affairs in Soviet times. After many clashes, the Leninabadis were forced to accept a compromise and a new coalition government was formed, incorporating members of the opposition and eventually dominated by them. On 7 September 1992, Nabiyev was captured by opposition protesters and forced at gunpoint to resign his presidency. Chaos and fighting between the opposing factions reigned outside of the capital Dushanbe.

With the aid of the Russian military and Uzbekistan, the Leninabadi-Kulobi Popular Front forces routed the opposition in early and late 1992. The coalition government in the capital was forced to resign. On 12 December 1992 the Supreme Soviet (parliament), where the Leninabadi-Kulobi faction had held the majority of seats all along, convened and elected a new government under the leadership of Emomali Rahmon, representing a shift in power from the old power based in Leninabad to the militias from Kulob, from which Rahmon came.

The height of hostilities occurred from 1992 to 1993 and pitted Kulobi militias against an array of groups, including militants from the Islamic Renaissance Party of Tajikistan (IRP) and ethnic minority Pamiris from Gorno-Badakhshan. In large part due to the foreign support they received, the Kulobi militias were able to soundly defeat opposition forces and went on what has been described by Human Rights Watch as an ethnic cleansing campaign against Pamiris and Garmis. The campaign was concentrated in areas south of the capital and included the murder of prominent individuals, mass killings, the burning of villages and the expulsion of the Pamiri and Garmi population into Afghanistan. The violence was particularly concentrated in Qurghonteppa, the power base of the IRP and home to many Garmis. Tens of thousands were killed or fled to Afghanistan.

Continued conflict (1993–1997)
In Afghanistan, the opposition reorganized and rearmed with the aid of the Jamiat-i-Islami. The group's leader Ahmad Shah Masoud became a benefactor of the Tajik opposition. Later in the war the opposition organized under an umbrella group called the United Tajik Opposition, or UTO. Elements of the UTO, especially in the Tavildara region, became the Islamic Movement of Uzbekistan, while the leadership of the UTO was opposed to the formation of the organization.

Other combatants and armed bands that flourished in this civil chaos simply reflected the breakdown of central authority rather than loyalty to a political faction. In response to the violence the United Nations Mission of Observers in Tajikistan was deployed. Most fighting in the early part of the war occurred in the southern part of the country, but by 1996 the rebels were battling Russian troops in the capital city of Dushanbe. Islamic radicals from northern Afghanistan also began to fight Russian troops in the region.

Armistice and aftermath

A United Nations-sponsored armistice finally ended the war in 1997. This was in part fostered by the Inter-Tajik Dialogue, a Track II diplomacy initiative in which the main players were brought together by international actors, namely the United States and Russia. The peace agreement eliminated the Leninabad region (Khujand) from power. Presidential elections were held on 6 November 1999.

The UTO warned in letters to United Nations Secretary General Kofi Annan and Tajik President Emomali Rahmon on 23 June 1997 that it would not sign the proposed peace agreement on 27 June if prisoner exchanges and the allocation of jobs in the coalition government were not outlined in the agreement. Akbar Turajonzoda, second-in-command of the UTO, repeated this warning on 26 June, but said both sides were negotiating. President Rahmon, UTO leader Sayid Abdulloh Nuri and Russian President Boris Yeltsin met in the Kremlin in Moscow on 26 June to finish negotiating the peace agreement. The Tajik government had previously pushed for settling these issues after the two sides signed the agreement, with the posts in the coalition government decided by a joint commission for national reconciliation and prisoner exchanges by a future set of negotiations. Russian Foreign Minister Yevgeny Primakov met with the Foreign Ministers of Iran, Kazakhstan and Turkmenistan to discuss the proposed peace accord.

By the end of the war, Tajikistan was in a state of complete devastation. Around 1.2 million people were refugees inside and outside the country. Tajikistan's physical infrastructure, government services and economy were in disarray and much of the population was surviving on subsistence handouts from international aid organizations. The United Nations established a Mission of Observers in December 1994, maintaining peace negotiations until the warring sides signed a comprehensive peace agreement in 1997.

Targeting of journalists

Journalists were particularly targeted for assassination and dozens of Tajik journalists were killed. Many more fled the country, leading to a brain drain. Notable individuals murdered include journalist and politician Otakhon Latifi, journalist and Jewish leader Meirkhaim Gavrielov, politician Safarali Kenjayev and four members of the United Nations Mission of Observers in Tajikistan: Yutaka Akino, a noted Japanese scholar of Central Asian history; Maj. Ryszard Szewczyk from Poland; Maj. Adolfo Scharpegge from Uruguay; and Jourajon Mahramov from Tajikistan; and documentary filmmaker Arcady Ruderman, from Belarus.

Gallery

See also
Tajikistan-Uzbekistan relations
United Nations Mission of Observers in Tajikistan
1992 Tajikistan protests

References

Further reading
 

 
 

 Mullojonov, Parviz. The History of the Tajik Civil War, 1992–1997 (2022) excerpt

External links

 Key texts and agreements in the Tajikistan peace process 
Tajikistan: Opposition criticizes Dushanbe's plan for Commission
Tajikistan: Two Russian military personnel killed
Tajikistan: Secular – not Shari'a – law prevails in eastern mountains
Tajikistan Civil War 1992–1994

1990s in Tajikistan
1992 in Tajikistan
1993 in Tajikistan
1994 in Tajikistan
1995 in Tajikistan
1996 in Tajikistan
1997 in Tajikistan
Civil wars involving the states and peoples of Asia
Civil wars post-1945
Conflicts in 1992
Conflicts in 1993
Conflicts in 1994
Conflicts in 1995
Conflicts in 1996
Conflicts in 1997
Ethnicity-based civil wars
Post-Soviet conflicts
Religion-based civil wars
Russia–Tajikistan relations
Wars involving Afghanistan
Wars involving Kazakhstan
Wars involving Kyrgyzstan
Wars involving Russia
Wars involving Tajikistan
Wars involving Uzbekistan
Proxy wars
Tajikistani Civil War refugees
Wars involving Nepal